The Thin Blue Line is a British sitcom which aired on BBC One from 1995 to 1996. It was created and written by Ben Elton, and starred Rowan Atkinson. The series was popular with viewers, though it suffered in critical reviews due to "inconsistent character development" and an "overly broad plot line". It was ranked number 34 in a poll for Britain's Best Sitcom. In September 2021, the series became available on BBC iPlayer. and also on STV Player.

Synopsis
The series is set in a police station in the fictional English town of Gasforth. A general parody of the serious police procedural, one of the main themes on the show sees the uniformed squad, led by Inspector Fowler, and the CID, led by Detective Inspector Grim, locking horns over similar, or even the same, issues while having conflicting views or methods of operations. Generally the uniformed section triumphs over the detectives, although not without their own foibles. Although other PCs and staff other than the main characters are visible in the background, they generally have no speaking parts.

Cast and characters

 Rowan Atkinson as Inspector Raymond Fowler, an old-fashioned policeman whose lack of interest in sex annoys his live-in girlfriend of ten years, Sergeant Dawkins. He has a son from a previous marriage.
 Serena Evans as Sergeant Patricia Dawkins, a desk sergeant. She is Inspector Fowler’s long-suffering partner and is forever on a quest for more sexual attention from Fowler, who is usually reluctant to oblige. Despite her frustration and anger, she loves Fowler devotedly and dreams of marrying him and having a child.
 David Haig as Detective Inspector Derek Grim, the head of the CID unit at Gasforth Police Station. In reference to a common trope in police dramas and procedurals, his attitude is that CID are superior to the uniformed police. He has been married for 20 years to Tina, with whom he has an intense love-hate relationship. Their son, Darren, was arrested in one episode.
 James Dreyfus as Constable Kevin Goody, who is perhaps the least complex of the officers. Profoundly unintelligent and oblivious to the obvious, he has very little idea of what being a police officer entails. Although his character is very camp, he is infatuated with Constable Habib.
 Mina Anwar as Constable Maggie Habib, a female officer of South Asian descent, who was raised in Accrington. Habib is generally the straight man in Fowler’s uniformed branch.
 Rudolph Walker as Constable Frank Gladstone, a Trinidad-origin constable near retirement, Gladstone has been a PC all his adult life, as was his father, and is enjoying his career winding down.
 Kevin Allen as Detective Constable Robert Kray (series 1), an officer in Grim’s CID unit. He is a very laddish cop, intelligent, cynical and pragmatic.
 Mark Addy as Detective Constable Gary Boyle (series 2), Kray’s replacement in the second series. Like Kray, he is intelligent, cynical, pragmatic, very laddish and likes being a police officer for the associated perks.

Many notable actors made guest appearances, and these include the writer Ben Elton, Stephen Fry, Stephen Moore, Melvyn Hayes, Trevor Peacock, Owen Teale, Colin McFarlane, Alan Cox, Alexander Armstrong, Nicola Stapleton, Perry Fenwick, Walter Sparrow, Geoffrey Chater, Gabrielle Blunt and Rupert Vansittart.

Episodes

Series 1 (1995)

Series 2 (1996)

Development
Creator and writer Ben Elton is a fan of Dad’s Army, and many of the characters were influenced by the show. Fowler’s relationship with Grim is very similar to that of Captain Mainwaring to Warden Hodges, in that they are both on the same side yet enemies. Also, Constable Goody is rather like Private Pike in being a “stupid boy” who often irritates Fowler. Constable Gladstone’s habit of interrupting a briefing with a story about life in Trinidad is similar to Lance Corporal Jones’ penchant for reminiscing about Sudan during Captain Mainwaring’s speeches. Other references include in the episode “Rag Week”, when Fowler is briefly seen walking out of a shop called “Mainwaring’s”. Elton has appeared in the programme himself, in the Christmas special episode “Yuletide Spirit”. In the first series, the “WANTED” poster behind Fowler’s desk in the briefing room is an E-FIT of Elton.

Home releases
Both series have been released on DVD in the United Kingdom (Region 2) by Vision Video Ltd. The Thin Blue Line is available in Region 1 (North America), having been released by BBC Warner. Episodes in the first series were not in broadcast order on both Region 1 and 2 DVDs. The Series 2 episodes in the Region 1 DVD are cut to fit about 30-minute runtime. For example, the biggest cut is from the S2E7 "The Green Eyed Monster" episode, which is cut from 40:45 UK/R2 runtime to 30:05 Region 1 runtime. The Region 1 release has English closed captions. The UK Region 2 does not have any subtitles.

References

Other sources
 Mark Lewisohn, "Radio Times Guide to TV Comedy", BBC Worldwide Ltd, 2003

External links

The Thin Blue Line
BBC – Comedy – Guide – The Thin Blue Line
BBC "Best Sitcom" ranking – Top 50

1995 British television series debuts
1996 British television series endings
1990s British crime television series
1990s British sitcoms
1990s British police comedy television series
BBC crime television shows
BBC television sitcoms
British crime comedy television series
British police comedy television series
English-language television shows
Television shows written by Ben Elton
Television series by Endemol
Television series by Tiger Aspect Productions
Television series created by Ben Elton
Television shows set in England